Colloidal particles in a sol are continuously bombarded by the molecules of the dispersion medium on all sides. The impacts are however not equal in every direction. As a result, the sol particles show random or zig-zag movements. This random or zig-zag motion of the colloidal particles in a sol  is called Brownian motion or Brownian movement.

The phenomenon of Brownian motion was observed by Robert Brown in the form of random zig-zag motion of pollen grains suspended in water.  This kind of movement is found in all colloidal systems. Such random motion is visible under ultramicroscopes and for bigger particles even under ordinary microscopes.

The Brownian motion becomes progressively less prominent, as the particles grow in size or the viscosity of the medium increases.

Colloidal chemistry
Random dynamical systems